Kurudere  is a small village in the Mersin Province, Turkey. It's part of Toroslar district (which is an intracity district within Greater Mersin). It is situated in the  Toros Mountains. It is situated on the road connecting Mersin to Arslanköy municipality. The population of Kurudere was only 75  as of 2012.

References

Villages in Toroslar District